Yang Guo, courtesy name Gaizhi, is the fictional protagonist of the wuxia novel The Return of the Condor Heroes by Jin Yong.

Birth and heritage
Yang Guo traces his lineage to Yang Zaixing, a Song general who participated in the Jin–Song Wars against the Jin Empire. His father, Yang Kang, is the antagonist in The Legend of the Condor Heroes and was notorious for committing several atrocities. His mother, Mu Nianci, was Yang Kang's lover. She left Yang Kang after seeing how unrepentant and incorrigible he was, but was already pregnant with Yang Guo at the time.

Yang Guo's birth is briefly mentioned at the end of the first novel. Mu Nianci met Guo Jing and Huang Rong shortly after giving birth to her son. Guo Jing, who was Yang Kang's sworn brother, hoped that Yang Kang's child will not follow in his father's footsteps. He named the baby boy "Guo", which means "wrong" or "fault", and gave him the courtesy name "Gaizhi", which means "to correct". Guo Jing hopes that Yang Guo would redeem the Yang family's honour, which has been tarnished by Yang Kang's villainy. He also promises Mu Nianci that he will teach Yang Guo martial arts when the boy becomes older.

Early life
Yang Guo became an orphan at the age of 11 after his mother died. His mother taught him some of the skills she learnt from his grandfather, Yang Tiexin, and the Beggars' Gang's former chief, Hong Qigong. He roams the jianghu after his mother's death and meets Guo Jing and Huang Rong by coincidence. They recognise him as the son of Yang Kang and Mu Nianci after seeing that he resembles his parents in appearance. Their suspicions are confirmed when Yang Guo demonstrates some combat skills that only Mu Nianci knew. The Guo couple then take him under their care. Huang Rong is initially suspicious of Yang Guo as she sees that he bears an uncanny resemblance to his father and worries that he will turn out to be like his father. She strongly opposes her husband's decision to instruct Yang Guo in martial arts and only teaches him literary arts such as poetry and Confucian classics.

Guo Jing brings Yang Guo to the Quanzhen School on Mount Zhongnan for better guidance and tutelage in orthodox martial arts and moral ethics. In an earlier misunderstanding, Guo Jing fought and defeated several Quanzhen students, who mistook him for an enemy. After Guo Jing left, the Quanzhen students vent their frustration on Yang Guo by picking on him and bullying him all the time. Yang Guo's martial arts teacher, Zhao Zhijing, is prejudiced against him and does not teach him any practical martial arts. Yang Guo is unable to stand the ill treatment so he flees from Quanzhen after injuring one of the bullies.

Yang Guo ventures into the nearby Tomb of the Living Dead and meets Xiaolongnü and Granny Sun. Xiaolongnü refuses to let him stay in the tomb and asks Granny Sun to send him back to Quanzhen. Granny Sun dotes on the boy and defends him from the bullies. The scuffle gradually escalates into a fight between Granny Sun and the Quanzhen School. Hao Datong, one of the "Seven Immortals of Quanzhen", accidentally kills Granny Sun during the fight. At this critical moment, Xiaolongnü shows up and rescues Yang Guo.

Love relationship with Xiaolongnü
Yang Guo joins the Ancient Tomb School as Xiaolongnü's apprentice and they live together in the Ancient Tomb for many years. During this time, they develop a romantic relationship, rendering their master-apprentice relationship merely superficial. Yang Guo meets Guo Jing and Huang Rong later and they immediately oppose his decision to marry Xiaolongnü. A romantic relationship between master and apprentice is regarded as highly taboo according to the prevailing norms of the wulin (martial artists' community). Yang Guo's impulsive personality and lack of respect for other senior martial artists, compounded by the rebellious streak in him, makes the situation worse. He then leaves with Xiaolongnü.

Yang Guo becomes an outcast of the wulin and is despised by fellow martial artists. However, he saves Guo Jing's family from danger on different occasions as he still respects the Guo couple as his surrogate uncle and aunt. He is briefly separated from Xiaolongnü numerous times throughout the novel, usually over misunderstandings but they are always reunited again later.

From rebellious youth to legendary hero
Throughout the novel, Yang Guo encounters several elite martial artists, including Huang Yaoshi, Ouyang Feng and Hong Qigong, who teach him some of their skills. He employs the skills he mastered to his advantage and uses them for greater purposes as he gradually matures. He creates a new palm technique called 'Melancholic Palms', an extremely powerful skill incorporating elements of all the skills he learnt earlier.

Yang Guo initially suspects that Guo Jing and Huang Rong are responsible for his father's death. He meets Jinlun Guoshi and agrees to help the Mongols kill Guo Jing. However, he becomes so impressed with Guo Jing's loyalty and strong sense of chivalry that he refrains from killing Guo Jing on a few occasions when he had a chance to. Because of a misunderstanding, Guo Jing's daughter, Guo Fu slices off his right arm with a sword in a heated quarrel. Yang Guo later hides in a cave, along with the Condor (a large god bird that can carry people, this bird knows martial arts and understands human language) practicing martial arts. Then, with the Condor, he saved many people in trouble and was honored as the Condor Hero. 

He eventually gives up his desire to avenge his father after hearing about his father's villainy and misdeeds. Yang Guo still maintains respect for his father despite learning of his father's past. He replaces the original headstone (inscribed by Qiu Chuji) on his father's grave, with a new one bearing the words: "Yang Kang, my late father. Erected by his unworthy son, Yang Guo." He takes Guo Jing's side and participates in defending the city of Xiangyang from Mongol invaders. At the end of the novel, he is reunited with Xiaolongnü, temporarily halts the Mongol invasion by slaying Möngke Khan, and becomes a legendary hero.

Martial arts and skills
At the end of the novel, Yang Guo becomes the most powerful martial artist of his time and is compared favourably to the "Five Greats" of the era, who are older and more experienced than him by a considerable margin. His martial arts are an eclectic mix of the numerous skills he gains under the tutelage of several legendary masters. At the end of the novel, Huang Rong names Yang Guo the "Western Passionate" of the new generation of the "Five Greats", replacing his deceased godfather, "Western Venom" Ouyang Feng.

Mu Nianci
Yang Guo's mother, Mu Nianci, taught him some of the martial arts she learnt from Yang Tiexin and Hong Qigong. However, due to his young age and his mother's demise, Yang Guo was unable to fully master those skills nor utilise them in combat. When he first met Guo Jing and Huang Rong, the latter managed to deduce that he is the son of Yang Kang and Mu Nianci by observing his movements.

Ouyang Feng
At the beginning of the story, Yang Guo encounters the insane Ouyang Feng, who likes him and accepts him as a godson. Ouyang Feng was a gifted but vicious Kung Fu practitioner and one of the older generation of the "Five Greats". In the Legend of the Condor Heroes, he became crazy after learning from a fake martial arts manual which limited his potential. He is still very strong though but can never go back to his old form.
Ouyang Feng teaches Yang Guo the Toad Skill. Yang Guo used this skill once in his childhood on the Wu brothers when he was bullied by them and he injured Wu Xiuwen. He uses the skill again when he is bullied in Quanzhen School and knocks out one of the bullies Lu Qingdu. He meets his godfather for the last time when the latter is fighting with Hong Qigong. Ouyang Feng teaches him the Serpent Staff techniques before his death.

Quanzhen School
In Quanzhen, Yang Guo becomes an apprentice of Zhao Zhijing, one of the apprentices of one of the senior members of the "Seven Immortals". However, Zhao holds a grudge against Guo Jing after the latter defeated him in an earlier misunderstanding. Zhao Zhijing then vents his frustration on Yang Guo after Guo Jing left. He is determined not to instruct Yang Guo in practical martial arts and merely teaches him the literary and verbal forms to disguise his neglect. Yang Guo is able to recite the verses smoothly but has not been taught how to apply them in actual combat.

Yang Guo only learnt how to apply those verses in martial arts after he joined the Ancient Tomb School. He uses the verses to help himself and Xiaolongnü master the Swordplay of Jade Maiden.

Ancient Tomb School
While in the Ancient Tomb, Yang Guo learnt the school's martial arts from Xiaolongnü. Some of the skills are listed as follows:

 Ancient Tomb School qinggong
 Fist of Beauties
 Palm of Infinity Web
 Swordplay of Jade Maiden, based on the Jade Maiden Heart Sutra

Five Poisons Secret Manual
Yang Guo was saved by Cheng Ying after he was injured in a fight against Jinlun Guoshi. Cheng Ying brings him to a secluded hut in a mountainous area to recuperate. On the same night, Li Mochou comes to kill Cheng Ying and her cousin Lu Wushuang. Lu Wushuang passes Yang Guo the Five Poisons Secret Manual, which she stole from Li Mochou, and tells him to memorise the book before destroying it.

Nine Yin Manual
In an early chapter, Yang Guo and Xiaolongnü were fleeing from Li Mochou when they stumble upon a secret chamber in the Ancient Tomb. They discover carvings of the Nine Yin Manual on the stone walls and practise them. Although Yang Guo does not manage to fully master all the skills in the manual, he integrates the fragmentary knowledge he gained from those carvings into his own martial arts and his prowess improves tremendously.

The manual is also a legacy of Yang Guo and Xiaolongnü. In The Heaven Sword and Dragon Saber, the Yellow Dress Maiden defeats Zhou Zhiruo's evil Nine Yin White Bone Claw (an unconventional skill derived from the manual) with an orthodox version of the Claw. Her family name is briefly mentioned to be "Yang" and she hints to Zhang Wuji that she is a descendant of the Condor Hero Couple (Yang Guo and Xiaolongnü), by saying: "Behind Mount Zhongnan in the Tomb of the Living Dead, the Condor Hero Couple disappear from the jianghu".

Hong Qigong
Yang Guo meets Hong Qigong and Ouyang Feng on Mount Hua. Hong Qigong and Ouyang Feng have been rivals for a long time and they fight again on the summit. Neither emerges the victor after several rounds of fighting. After many days, both of them are physically weakened after pitting their inner energy against each other. Both of them thought of new techniques to counter each other's moves but fatigue prevents them from doing so. Yang Guo has been an observer throughout this time and they decide to use him as an intermediary, performing each technique for the other to see. He learns the Dog Beating Staff Technique from Hong Qigong. Yang Guo uses this skill during a duel against the Mongols, surprising Huang Rong and Guo Jing. Huang Rong was curious but Guo Jing was nothing but ecstatic for Yang Guo.

Huang Yaoshi
Yang Guo meets Huang Yaoshi once while he is escaping from Li Mochou together with Lu Wushuang and Cheng Ying. Huang Yaoshi helps them defeat and drive away Li Mochou, and then chats with Yang Guo. Huang Yaoshi likes Yang Guo because of their similar disdain for rules and customs, and teaches him the Finger Flicking Skill and Jade Flute Swordplay. Huang Yaoshi also teaches Yang Guo how to utilise his inner energy to its full potential.

Dugu Qiubai
In a dramatic twist of events, Guo Jing's daughter Guo Fu attacks Yang Guo in a heated argument and slices off his right arm with a sword. Yang Guo is weakened and delirious from losing too much blood, but manages to stagger away and is later saved by the Condor. The Condor was once a companion of Dugu Qiubai, a great swordsman who lived long ago and whose skills were unparalleled in his time.

The Condor helps Yang Guo recover from his wound and leads him to the items left behind by Dugu Qiubai. Yang Guo inherits Dugu Qiubai's Heavy Iron Sword and learns Dugu's swordplay techniques from the Condor. Dugu Qiubai's swordplay skills are advantageous to the handicapped Yang Guo as they focus on great strength rather than fancy moves. Yang Guo trains with the Condor in the rain which dramatically improves his inner energy to fit the heavy sword. He overcomes his disability to wield the Heavy Iron Sword with one arm and also he had been consuming snake gallbladders every day for over a month. His inner energy at this point was near its peak and could easily rival anyone in wulin from this point.

Yang Guo confronts Jinlun Guoshi, Da'erba and Huodu on Mount Zhongnan later and defeats them easily with the Heavy Iron Sword. After his separation from Xiaolongnü again, he returns to join the Condor and continues with his training for another seven years tremendously  improving his swordsmanship to the point where he is stronger without a weapon than with a weapon. He had nearly learned all of Dugu Qiubai's swordplay (everything that was written inside the cave) although no one knew if there were more to it.

Melancholic Palms
Yang Guo's agony and misery from being separated from Xiaolongnü spurs him to create a new set of palm techniques, known as the 'Melancholic Palms', which incorporates elements of all the martial arts he learnt in his whole life. Its movements are based on Yang Guo's emotions and despite its designation as a palm technique, incorporates the use of the full body.

Yang Guo spars with Huang Yaoshi and Zhou Botong with his new skill and they are impressed. Huang Yaoshi remarked that Yang Guo's new palm techniques can  rival Guo Jing's Eighteen Subduing Dragon Palms.

In film and television
Notable actors who have portrayed Yang Guo in films and television series include Patrick Tse (1960), Alexander Fu (1982), Leslie Cheung (1983), Andy Lau (1983), Louis Koo (1995), Christopher Lee (1998), Richie Ren (1998), Huang Xiaoming (2006) and Chen Xiao (2014).

Family tree
Yang Kang (Father)
Mu Nianci (Mother)

References

Fictional adoptees
Fictional amputees
Fictional Han people
Fictional Song dynasty people
Fictional wushu practitioners
Jin Yong characters
Literary characters introduced in 1959
Orphan characters in literature
The Return of the Condor Heroes